George Barclay may refer to:

George Barclay (Jacobite) ( 1636–1710), leader of a 1696 plot to assassinate King William III of England
George Barclay (clergyman) (c. 1779–1857), Baptist minister in Upper Canada
Sir George Head Barclay (1862–1921), British diplomat
George Barclay (sportsperson) (1876–1909), American baseball and football player, inventor of the first football helmet
George T. Barclay (1910–1997), American football player and coach
George Barclay (RAF officer) (1920–1942), British pilot who was killed in action on the battle of El Alamein; author of Angels 22
George Barclay (speedway rider) (born 1937), British motorcycle speedway rider and founder of the National Speedway Museum
Pen name of Ronald Kinnoch

See also
George Barclay Bruce (1821–1908), British civil engineer